Two Kinds of Women may refer to:

 Two Kinds of Women (1922 film), a lost American silent western film
 Two Kinds of Women (1932 film), an American pre-Code drama film